Alexis Thérèse Petit (2 October 1791, Vesoul, Haute-Saône – 21 June 1820, Paris) was a French physicist.

Petit is known for his work on the efficiencies of air- and steam-engines, published in 1818 (Mémoire sur l’emploi du principe des forces vives dans le calcul des machines). His well-known discussions with the French physicist Sadi Carnot, founder of thermodynamics, may have stimulated Carnot in his reflexions on heat engines and thermodynamic efficiency. The Dulong–Petit law (1819) is named after him and his collaborator Pierre Louis Dulong.

Biography
Petit was born in Vesoul, Haute-Saône. At the age of 10, he proved that he was already capable of taking the difficult entrance exam to France's most prestigious scientific school of the time, the École Polytechnique of Paris. He was then placed in a preparatory school where he actually served as a "répétiteur" to help his own classmates digest the course material. He duly entered Polytechnique at the lowest permissible age, in 1807, and graduated "hors-rang" in 1809 (which is to say that he clearly outranked all of his classmates).

After graduation, Petit stayed at Polytechnique as a faculty member, first as répétiteur in analysis and mechanics (1809) then in physics (1810). He taught for some time at Lycée Bonaparte. At Polytechnique, he served as a substitute (1814) for Jean Henri Hassenfratz whom he would replace in 1815. He thus became the second professor of physics at Polytechnique and the youngest person ever to hold that position, at the age of 23.

Petit and François Arago were brothers-in-law because they married two sisters. In 1814, the two men collaborated on a paper together.

Petit first collaborated with Pierre Louis Dulong for the competition of the Académie des sciences about refrigeration (1815). Petit is now probably best known for the surprising Dulong–Petit law concerning the specific heat capacity of metals, which both men formulated together in 1819 and which Albert Einstein explained almost a century later. Petit also designed a special thermometer (using weights) to determine the thermal dilatation coefficients of several metals.

Petit died from tuberculosis at the age of 28, shortly after the passing of his wife. He was succeeded by Dulong as professor of physics at the Polytechnique (1820).

Jules Jamin, a contemporary and fellow physicist provides biographical and temperament details:

References

Further reading
R Fox, Biography in Dictionary of Scientific Biography (New York 1970-1990).
R Fox, The background to the discovery of Dulong and Petit's law, British J. His. Sci. 4 (1968–69), 1-22.
J W van Spronsen, The history and prehistory of the law of Dulong and Petit as applied to the determination of atomic weights, Chymia 12 (1967), 157–169.

1791 births
1820 deaths
People from Vesoul
French physicists
Thermodynamicists
École Polytechnique alumni